24 Kisses is a 2018 Indian Telugu language romantic comedy-drama film about modern age relationships and the transformation of the lead characters. It was directed by Ayodhyakumar Krishnamsetty, and starring Adith Arun, Hebah Patel, Rao Ramesh, Naresh and Ravi Varma. The film was written by Krishnamsetty along with Harishankar Tamminana. It was co-produced by Krishnamsetty and Giridhar Mamidipally.

The film's cinematography was by Uday Gurrala and editing by Anil Aalayam. It was released under the banner, Silly Monks Entertainments on 23 November in 2018. It appears to be an autobiographical reference to the incidents in the director's life.

Plot
Filmmaker Anand (Adith Arun) is not interested in the institution of marriage. He doesn't want to get married anytime soon, though he had several affairs. Once he gets into a relationship with Sri Lakshmi (Hebah Patel) as well. Lakshmi falls in love with Anand. Upon learning of his ideology in the institution of marriage, she breaks up with him. Rest of the story deals with whether Anand changes his opinion to win back his love.

Cast
 Adith Arun as Anand
 Hebah Patel as Sri Lakshmi
 Rao Ramesh as psychiatrist Murthy
 Naresh as Sri Lakshmi's father
 Ravi Varma
 Aditi Myakal as Vishwa
 Kishore Gundala as Sudheer
 Srinivasa Kapavarapu as Praveen
 Sanjay Reddy as an angel investor

Soundtracks

References

External links
 
 

2018 romantic comedy-drama films
Indian romantic comedy-drama films
Films about film directors and producers
Films about couples
Films about marriage